Chien may refer to:

Chien (name)
Les Chiens, Canadian rock band

Jian (disambiguation), 
Padre Pedro Chien Municipality or Chien, a municipality in Venezuela 
Qian (disambiguation),

See also

Bayou de Chien, Kentucky, United States
Prairie du Chien, Wisconsin, United States
Rivière aux Chiens (disambiguation), multiple rivers in Quebec, Canada
La Chienne, 1931 French film
La Chienne (story), a short story by Georges de La Fouchardière that was later turned into several films

Chine, a steep-sided coastal gorge where a river flows to the sea
Chine (disambiguation)
 L'Autrichienne (disambiguation)